Samsung Heavy Industries Rugby Club was a South Korean rugby football team in Samsung Heavy Industries.

See also 
 Samsung Heavy Industries
 Samsung Sports

References

External links
 Official website

Rugby clubs established in 1995
Rugby union clubs disestablished in 2015
Sports teams in South Gyeongsang Province
Samsung Sports
1995 establishments in South Korea
2015 disestablishments in South Korea
Defunct rugby union teams